Manuel "Manu" Fernandez (1 February 1922 – 9 January 1971) was a French-Spanish football defender who played for Lens, Clermont and Saint-Étienne.

He coached Lyon.

References

External links
Player profile

1922 births
1971 deaths
Spanish footballers
French footballers
RC Lens players
Clermont Foot players
AS Saint-Étienne players
Ligue 1 players
Ligue 2 players
French football managers
Olympique Lyonnais managers
French people of Spanish descent

Association football defenders